Nikola Kovač, better known as NiKo, is a Bosnian professional Counter-Strike: Global Offensive player for G2 Esports.

Career

2011 
NiKo played Counter-Strike 1.6 at this period. His first professional team was FullProof. During this time he played in a number of teams including eu4ia, neWave, maksnet and DEFUSE.maksnet.

2012-14 
His first Counter-Strike: Global Offensive team was iNation. He shuffled through myDGB, e-Sports.rs, Team Refuse, GamePub and aimface while taking breaks from iNation.

2015 
His impressive performance with iNation gained him notoriety throughout Europe. Finally mousesports signed him in March 2015. That led to a sensational rookie run where his team was often dubbed "Nikosports" due to his amazing individual performances, with one of them being his deagle ace in cache.

2016 
He played for mousesports for the entirety of 2016. During this time they won Acer Predator Masters Season 2 and were ranked 3-4th in ELEAGUE Season 1, ESL One: New York 2016 European Qualifier, ESL Pro League Season 4 - Europe and ESL Pro League Season 4 - Finals.

2017 
In February 2017 he was acquired by FaZe Clan to garner together a star-player team. Kovač's first big tournament win was at StarLadder i-League StarSeries Season 3, followed by a winless period of five months with a near miss at Esports Championship Series Season 3. Following a re-shuffle of the FaZe roster, bringing in the two best players of 2015; Olof "olofmeister" Kajbjer Gustafsson and Ladislav "GuardiaN" Kovács, FaZe was rejuvenated and managed back-to-back flawless victories at ESL One: New York 2017 and ELEAGUE CS:GO Premier 2017. Following this, the team went two months without a win before taking the Esports Championship Series Season 4 trophy over mousesports at the end of the year. He was ranked in #2 in the year end HLTV top 20 and had a rivalry with coldzera throughout the year.

2018 
Falling just short in ELEAGUE Major: Boston 2018, the first Major of 2018, the team then entered another lull, this time with Richard "Xizt" Landström standing in for olofmeister, until they managed to take home Intel Extreme Masters XIII - Sydney, and shortly after, managing to win ESL One: Belo Horizonte 2018 trophies at the beginning of the summer with Jørgen "cromen" Robertsen as a stand-in. In October 2018, FaZe came first place in the EPICENTER 2018 event in Moscow, Russia, making this his seventh first-place victory at a premier event with FaZe Clan. He was ranked No. 3 at the HLTV top 20 even though he had better stats than #2 ranked dev1ce.

2019 
The team went through a number of IGL during this time after the removal of karrigan last year. By the end of 2019 Faze's trophy count had gone up to ten as they won BLAST Pro Series Copenhagen. But they couldn't reach top 4 of either of the majors. Statistically this was the worst year of NiKo's career as he had picked up IGL duties and he finished outside of the top 10 for the first time since 2016 in the HLTV top 20.

2020 
2020 marked another victory for FaZe and now IGL Kovač, as they won the European division of IEM New York 2020 Online over OG. On October 28, 2020, after a three-and-a-half year venture with FaZe Clan, Kovač was acquired by G2 Esports and was united with his cousin huNter.

Without the IGL duties to perform, NiKo was back in his old form again this year and was ranked No. 4 in HLTV top 20.

2021 
He led his team to the grand finals of the PGL Major Stockholm 2021 but lost to a dominant Na'Vi team. They had also been runner-up to the same Na'Vi team at Intel Extreme Masters XVI - Cologne earlier in the year. He went through a career best run in the second half of 2021 with CSGO's return to LAN, posting a consecutive 39 map 1+ rating streak, the highest of any top 20 players that year. He finished third in the HLTV top 20, behind ZywOo and S1mple.

2022 
2022 started out strong for G2 and Niko finishing 2nd place at IEM Katowice, but things turned for the worse with many losses with the only other top 4 result being at Blast Premier Spring Finals. G2 did not qualify for the IEM Rio Major, with Niko commenting that these times are his toughest months of his career but reassured that he will never give up. Niko and G2 bounced back and won the Blast Premier World Final 2022. He finished fifth in the HLTV Top 20.

2023 
On 12 February 2023, G2 won IEM Katowice 2023 undefeated, only suffering a loss on a single map to the hands of Heroic in the grand finals. This was NiKo's 1st time winning IEM Katowice and his 4th Katowice finals, having made it to the finals in 2017, 2018, and 2022, but lost all 3 finals.

Awards and recognition
 Was voted the 11th best player of 2016 by HLTV.
 Was voted the 2nd best player of 2017 by HLTV.
 Was voted the 3rd best player of 2018 by HLTV.
Was voted the 11th best player of 2019 by HLTV.
Was voted the 4th best player of 2020 by  HLTV.
Was voted the 3rd best player of 2021 by HLTV.
Was voted the 5th best player of 2022 by HLTV.
 Was voted the MVP of 7 different tournaments.

References

1997 births
Living people
People from Brčko District
Bosnia and Herzegovina esports players
Counter-Strike players
Mousesports players
FaZe Clan players
Twitch (service) streamers
G2 Esports players
Serbs of Bosnia and Herzegovina